Polytechnic of Rijeka is one of the largest polytechnic institutions in Croatia with departments in: Rijeka, Poreč, Pazin, Pula, Otočac, Gospić and Ogulin. It was founded in 1998.

Sections 
Business section
 professional study computer science
 professional study of entrepreneurship
 Specialist Professional Graduate Study of Information Science and Technology in Business Systems
 Specialist Professional Graduate Study of Entrepreneurship
Transport Department
 Professional Study of Road Transport
 Professional Study of Railroad Transport
 Professional Study of Postal Services
 Specialist Professional Graduate Study of Traport.
Occupational Safety Department
 Professional Study of Occupational Safety
 Specialist Professional Graduate Study of Occupational Safety.
Agricultural Department
 Professional Study of Winemaking
 Professional Study of Mediterranean Agriculture
 Specialist Professional Graduate Study of Winemaking.
Department of Telematics

External links 
 Polytechnic of Rijeka
 Polytechnic of Rijeka student union

Universities and colleges in Croatia
Education in Rijeka